The Legend of the Boy and the Eagle is a 1967 American live-action Walt Disney film.

Plot summary
A Hopi Indian boy is banished from his village after he defies tribal law and frees a sacred, sacrificial eagle. After surviving in the wilderness he returns to his village where he is again rejected. Fleeing, the boy climbs a cliff and jumps off but before he reaches the ground turns into an eagle.

Cast 
 Stanford Lomakema as The Eagle boy
 Frank Dekova as Narrator (voice)
 April Begay as Sister

See also
List of American films of 1967

External links
 

1967 films
1960s English-language films
Walt Disney Pictures films
Films directed by Jack Couffer
Films about Native Americans
1967 Western (genre) films
American Western (genre) films
Disney short films
1960s American films